Marco Benfatto (born 6 January 1988) is an Italian professional racing cyclist, who most recently rode for UCI ProTeam .

Major results

2012
 1st Stage 1 Giro del Friuli-Venezia Giulia
 1st Stage 2a Giro Ciclistico d'Italia
2013
 2nd Riga Grand Prix
 3rd Poreč Trophy
 4th Trofej Umag
 4th Jūrmala Grand Prix
 10th Race Horizon Park 1
2014
 Tour of Qinghai Lake
1st Stages 2 & 4
 1st Stage 5 Tour de Normandie
 9th Overall Tour of China II
2016
 1st  Overall Tour of China II
1st  Points classification
1st Stages 1, 4 & 5
 Tour of China I
1st Points classification
1st Stages 1, 2 & 6
 Tour of Bihor
1st  Points classification
1st Stages 2 & 3
2017
 Tour of China II
1st Stages 3 & 4
 1st Stage 5 Tour of China I
 9th La Roue Tourangelle
2018
 Tour of China I
1st Stages 3 & 5
 1st Stage 7 Tour of Hainan
 1st Stage 4 Vuelta a Venezuela
2019
 Tour of China I
1st  Points classification
1st Stage 1 & 5
 Tour of China II
1st Stage 1 & 2
 Tour of Taihu Lake
1st Stages 1 & 6
 1st Stage 1 Vuelta al Táchira
 1st Stage 8 Tour de Langkawi
2020
 5th Trofej Umag

References

External links
 

1988 births
Living people
Italian male cyclists
People from Camposampiero
Cyclists from the Province of Padua